Micromeles is a genus of flowering plants belonging to the family Rosaceae.

Its native range is Nepal to Japan and Sumatra.

Species
Species:

Micromeles calcicola 
Micromeles coronata 
Micromeles cuspidata 
Micromeles griffithii 
Micromeles japonica 
Micromeles paucinerva 
Micromeles prunifolia 
Micromeles rhamnoides 
Micromeles rhombifolia 
Micromeles zahlbruckneri

References

Rosaceae
Rosaceae genera
Taxa named by Joseph Decaisne